The Licentiate of Arts is a degree roughly equivalent to the completion of half the coursework required for a doctoral dissertation in arts. The academic degree licentiate exists in various European countries. The University of Art and Design Helsinki acknowledges the degree Licentiate of Arts.

Academic degrees